Railway Heroes is a Chinese war film directed by Yang Feng and starring Zhang Hanyu, Fan Wei, Vision Wei, Zhou Ye, and Yu Haoming. The film follows the story of a Counter-Japanese Underground Armed Force of the Communist Party in Shandong during the Second Sino-Japanese War. The film premiered in China on 19 November 2021.

Cast
 Zhang Hanyu as Lao Hong or Old Hong
 Fan Wei as Lao Wang or Old Wang
 Vision Wei as Qi Shunt
 Zhou Ye as Zhuang Yan
 Yu Haoming as Lin Dong

Music

Release
Railway Heroes was slated for release on 1 October 2021 in China but was postponed to 19 November 2021.

References

External links

 Railway Heroes at rottentomatoes.com

2021 films
2020s Mandarin-language films
Chinese war films
Films set in Shandong